Deportivo Xinabajul is a Guatemalan professional football club based in Huehuetenango, Guatemala. They compete in the Liga Nacional, the top tier of Guatemalan football.

Founded in 1980, they competed in the Liga Nacional, the top division in the nation, and played home matches at the Estadio Los Cuchumatanes.

History
In the of summer 2012, the club was disaffiliated and disbanded after not paying player salaries and going into heavy debt. Bad ownership and mismanagement led to the downfall of the club. A new club from the same city claiming to have no relation to Deportivo Xinabajul, was founded weeks later, they began play in division 3. Ever since then, the team has been playing in the Primera División, the second tier of Guatemalan football.

The club returned to the Liga Nacional in June 2022 after winning their promotional playoff game against Marquense.

Current squad

Notable former players
  Álvaro Hurtarte
  Henry Medina
  Sergio Azurdia
  Hetzon Pereira
  Usiel Rivas
  Andrés Quiñonez
  Ademar
  Valtencir
  Matías González
  Raul Peñaranda 
  Martín Zúñiga 
  Darwin Pacheco
  Fernando Patterson

External links
PuroXinabajul 
facebook
instagram

References

Huehuetenango Department
Football clubs in Guatemala
Association football clubs established in 1980
1980 establishments in Guatemala